The SZD-20x Wampir II (Szybowcowy Zakład Doświadczalny - Glider Experimental Works)  was a single-seat tail-less research glider designed and built in Poland from 1959.

Development 
The SZD-20X Wampir II (vampire II) was designed to compare a flying wing designed to Standard class rules with a more conventional standard class glider. Main designer was Jan Dyrek. Based on experience with the earlier SZD-6X Nietoperz  and SZD-13 Wampir tail-less gliders, the SZD-20X was an all wood flying wing, with the pilot sitting in a pod extending aft of the trailing edge on the centreline, and large swept fins & rudders at approx 2/3 span on each wing.

The SZD-20X was associated with the number 15, having a 15m span, aspect ratio of 15 and wing area of 15m², whether this was by design or accident is not known.
Early flight trials commenced with hops towed behind a car to test control responses, followed by an aero-tow launch on 9 September 1959, piloted by Adam Zientek. Flight trials revealed a marked sensitivity to turbulence resulting in flutter, and during trials at stalling speed, the SZD-20X entered a spin, which the rudders were unable to recover the aircraft from, only when the pilot shifted his weight as far forward as he could, did the SZD-20X recover from the spin. Flying in the SZD-20X continued until 6 October 1959, when turbulence-induced flutter tore the aircraft apart, the pilot escaping with parachute.

Specifications

See also

Notes

References

Further reading
  Taylor, J. H. (ed) (1989) Jane's Encyclopedia of Aviation. Studio Editions: London. p. 29

External links

 http://www.vintagesailplanes.de/SZD_20.htm

SZD-20
1950s Polish experimental aircraft
Tailless aircraft
SZD-20
Aircraft first flown in 1959
Mid-wing aircraft